The 2017 Volta a Catalunya was a road cycling stage race that took place between 20 and 26 March. It was the 97th edition of the Volta a Catalunya and the ninth event of the 2017 UCI World Tour.

The race was won for the second time by  rider Alejandro Valverde, who – like all of his teammates received a one-minute time penalty in the team time trial stage of the race – won three stages, the mountains classification as well as the overall general classification. The podium was completed by Valverde's teammate Marc Soler – taking the young rider classification as a result – a further 13 seconds adrift of Contador.

Teams
As the Volta a Catalunya is a UCI World Tour event, all eighteen UCI WorldTeams were invited automatically and obliged to enter a team in the race. Seven UCI Professional Continental teams competed, completing the 25-team peloton.

Route
The full route of the 2017 Volta a Catalunya was announced on 9 March 2017. The race featured a team time trial for the first time since 2007, and its longest since 1964.

Stages

Stage 1
20 March 2017 — Calella to Calella,

Stage 2
21 March 2017 — Banyoles to Banyoles, team time trial (TTT)

Stage 3
22 March 2017 — Mataró to La Molina,

Stage 4
23 March 2017 — La Seu d'Urgell to Igualada,

Stage 5
24 March 2017 — Valls to Lo Port,

Stage 6
25 March 2017 — Tortosa to Reus,

Stage 7
26 March 2017 — Barcelona to Barcelona,

Classification leadership table
In the 2017 Volta a Catalunya, four different jerseys were awarded. The general classification was calculated by adding each cyclist's finishing times on each stage. Time bonuses were awarded to the first three finishers on all stages except for the team time trial: the stage winner won a ten-second bonus, with six and four seconds for the second and third riders respectively. Bonus seconds were also awarded to the first three riders at intermediate sprints; three seconds for the winner of the sprint, two seconds for the rider in second and one second for the rider in third. The leader of the general classification received a white and green jersey. This classification was considered the most important of the 2017 Volta a Catalunya, and the winner of the classification was considered the winner of the race.

The second classification was the sprints classification, the leader of which was awarded a white-and-black jersey. In the sprints classification, riders received points for finishing in the top three at intermediate sprint points during each stage. There was also a mountains classification, the leadership of which was marked by a red jersey. Points for this classification were won by the first riders to the top of each categorised climb, with more points available for the higher-categorised climbs.

The fourth jersey represented the young rider classification, marked by a white "design" jersey. Only riders born after 1 January 1992 were eligible; the young rider best placed in the general classification was the leader of the young rider classification. There was also a classification for teams, in which the times of the best three cyclists per team on each stage were added together; the leading team at the end of the race was the team with the lowest total time.

Notes

References

Sources

External links

2017
2017 UCI World Tour
2017 in Spanish road cycling
2017 in Catalan sport
March 2017 sports events in Spain